Trentinara is a town and comune near Paestum in the province of Salerno in the Campania region of south-western Italy.

Geography
The municipality, located in northern Cilento, borders with Capaccio, Cicerale, Giungano, Monteforte Cilento and Roccadaspide. Known for its views and landscape, the area is sometimes referred to as "The Cilento's Terrace".

See also
Cilentan dialect
Cilento and Vallo di Diano National Park

References

External links

Cities and towns in Campania
Localities of Cilento